Slovak Railways or Slovak railways may refer to:

 Rail transport in Slovakia
 Railways of the Slovak Republic (Slovak: Železnice Slovenskej republiky), the state-owned railway infrastructure company of Slovakia
 Železničná spoločnosť Slovensko, Slovak state-owned passenger train company
 Železničná spoločnosť Cargo Slovakia, Slovak state-owned freight train company

Disambiguation pages